Boqsani (also Romanized as Boqşānī; also known as Boqşānī-ye ‘Olyā, Bokhsānī,  and Qaşanī) is a village in Bostan Rural District, Sangan District, Khaf County, Razavi Khorasan Province, Iran. At the 2006 census, its population was 29, in 10 families.

References 

Populated places in Khaf County